The Command and Control Regiment, is the Swedish Armed Forces command and control and army electronic warfare center that traces its origins back to the 19th century. The regiment is currently garrisoned in Enköping, Uppland.

History 

The regiment has its origins in the field signal (later telegraphy) company raised in 1871. This unit then evolved and finally became Uppland Regiment in 1974. That regiment was disbanded in 2006 but was replaced by the Command and Control Regiment, which took part the role that the Uppland Regiment previously had. The regiment was commanded by Colonel Lena Hallin, the first female regimental commander in Swedish history, until January 2011. The current regimental commander is Colonel Johan Axelsson.

Organisation 
Current organisation of the regiment is:

 Regimental Headquarters, at Enköping
 Management Location Battalion (Ledingsplatsbataljonen)
 52nd Information Platoon (52. Infopluton)
 Combat Camera Platoon (Combat Camera Pluton)
 51st Interpreting Platoon (51. Tolkpluton)
 Liaison Battalion (Sambandsbataljonen)
 Electronic Warfare Battalion (Telekrigbataljonen)
 Tactical Psychological Operations Team (Taktiskt Psykologiska Operationer Team)
 Electronic Warfare Support Unit , in Stockholm (Telekrigstödenheten)
 Telecommunications Sub-Division (Telekrig Underavdelningarna)
 Tactics and Technology Development Sub-Division (Taktik och Teknikutveckling Underavdelningarna)
 Naval Underwater Sensor Analysis Centre Sub-Division (Marinens Undervattenssensoranalyscentral Underavdelningarna)
 Armed Forces Meteorological and Oceanographic Centres (Försvarsmaktens Meteorologiska Och Oceanografiska Centrum)
 Production Department (Produktionsavdelningen)
 Education Department (Utbildningsavdelningen)
 Development Department (Utvecklingsavdelningen)
 Systems Tasks Department (Systemavdelningen)
 Lead Combat School (Ledningsstridsskolan)
 Staff Department (Stabsavdelningen)
 Division of Services (Tjänstegrensavdelningen)
 Development Department (Utvecklingsavdelningen)
 Education Department (Utblindningsavdelningen)
 Swedish Armed Forces' Signal Protection School (Totalförsvarets Signalskyddsskola)
 Training Department (Träningsavdelningen)
 Technology and Support Department (Teknik och Stödavdelningen)
 Technology and Maintenance Office TVK Ledsyst (Teknik och Vidmakthållandekonto r TVK Ledsyst)

Heraldry and traditions
The Command and Control Regiment was raised on 1 January 2007 and its colour was presented by His Majesty the King Command and Control Regiment on 4 June 2009. The colour is based on the coat of arms, but also links to the historical legacy of the Command and Control Regiment, from the previous signal regiments.

The Command and Control Regiment continues the traditions from Uppland Regiment (I 8), Uppland Regiment (S 1), Göta Signal Corps (S 2), Norrland Signal Corps (S 3), Södermanland Regiment (P 10), Västmanland Regiment (Fo 48). In addition, the regiment continuous the memory of the Göta Life Guards (P 1).

In 2007, the Ledningsregementets förtjänstmedalj ("Command and Control Regiment Medal of Merit") in gold (LedRGM) and silver (LedRSM) was established.

Commanding officers
2007–2010: Lena Hallin
2011–2014: Thomas Nilsson
2014–2014: Håkan Petersson 
2014–2015: Mikael Åkerström
2016–2020: Mattias Hansson
2020–2022: Johan Axelsson
1 August – 30 September 2022: Colonel Per Nilsson (acting)
1 October 2022 – 30 April 2026: Colonel Per Nilsson

Names, designations and locations

See also
List of Swedish signal regiments

Footnotes

References

Notes

Print

External links
 
 

Military communications regiments of the Swedish Army
Military units and formations established in 2007
2007 establishments in Sweden
Enköping Garrison